The  is a Japanese funicular line in Sotogahama, Aomori, operated by the Seikan Tunnel Museum. The  narrow-gauge line descends from the museum near Cape Tappi into an underground station on the Seikan Tunnel, which is one of the longest railway tunnels in the world, second to the Gotthard Base Tunnel in Switzerland that opened in June 2016. Transfer to other stations is not possible from the museum.

Tappi-Kaitei Station, the JR station in the tunnel, was installed for fast evacuation. Passengers of the funicular must join a guided tour that takes them back to the museum.

Participants in a different guided tour may take the funicular from the Kaikyō Line. The tour returns them to a Kaikyō Line train.

Basic data
Distance:  
System: Single-track with single car, balanced with a weight
Gauge: 
Elevation:

See also
Kaikyō Line
List of funicular railways
List of railway companies in Japan
List of railway lines in Japan
Seikan Tunnel

External links 
 Seikan Tunnel Museum official website

Underground funiculars
Funicular railways in Japan
Seikan Tunnel
Rail transport in Aomori Prefecture
3 ft gauge railways in Japan